Jean-Julien Rojer and Horia Tecău were the defending champions, but chose not to participate this year.
Marin Draganja and Henri Kontinen won the title, defeating Fabrice Martin and Purav Raja in the final, 6–4, 6–4.

Seeds

Draw

Draw

References
 Main Draw

PBZ Zagreb Indoors - Doubles
2015 Doubles
2015 PBZ Zagreb Indoors